Pravara Rural College of Pharmacy (P.R.C.O.P.), is an institution affiliated to the University of Pune, India and is recognized by All India Council for Technical Education, New Delhi (India). The institute provides certified diploma, bachelors and masters(Pharmacognosy, Pharmaceutics and Pharmachemistry) degree in the field of Pharmacy.

History 
Pravara Rural College of Pharmacy has its origin in 1981-82 when Diploma in Pharmacy Course was established as one of the seven disciplines in Padmashri Dr. Vitthalrao Vikhe Patil Institute of Technology & Engineering (Polytechnic) at Pravaranagar by Hon’ble Shri. E. V. alias Balasaheb Vikhe Patil, M.P. & Ex.Minister, Heavy Industries & Public Enterprises, Govt. of India to meet the demands of Pharmacist of this rural area.

External links 
 Official site of Pravara Rural College of Pharmacy
 Pravara Rural Engineering College

References 

Pharmacy colleges in Maharashtra
Education in Ahmednagar district
Colleges affiliated to Savitribai Phule Pune University
Educational institutions established in 1981
1981 establishments in Maharashtra